Toledo is a city and municipality of Spain, capital of the province of Toledo and the de jure seat of the government and parliament of the autonomous community of Castilla–La Mancha. Toledo was declared a World Heritage Site by UNESCO in 1986 for its extensive monumental and cultural heritage.

Located on the banks of the Tagus in central Iberia, Toledo is known as the "City of the Three Cultures" for the cultural influences of Christians, Muslims, and Jews throughout its history. It was the capital, from 542 to 725 CE, of the Visigothic kingdom, which followed the fall of the Roman Empire. Toledo was also the location of historic events such as the Councils of Toledo and was labelled the "Imperial City" due to the fact that it was the main venue of the court of Charles V, Holy Roman Emperor in Spain. The city, seat of a powerful archdiocese for much of its history, has a Gothic Cathedral, the Catedral Primada de España ("The Primate Cathedral of Spain"), and a long history in the production of bladed weapons, which are now common souvenirs of the city.

, the municipality had a population of 83,226.

Coat of arms

The town was granted arms in the 16th century, which by special royal privilege was based on the royal of arms of Spain.

History

Roman era and Late Antiquity

Toledo (Latin: Toletum) is mentioned by the Roman historian Livy (ca. 59 BCE – 17 CE) as urbs parva, sed loco munita ("a small city, but fortified by location"). Roman general Marcus Fulvius Nobilior fought a battle near the city in 193 BCE against a confederation of Celtic tribes; defeating them and capturing a king called Hilermus. At that time, Toletum was a city of the Carpetani tribe, and part of the region of Carpetania. It was incorporated into the Roman Empire as a civitas stipendiaria, (a tributary city of non-citizens) and later a municipium. With this status, city officials obtained Roman citizenship for public service, and the forms of Roman law and politics were increasingly adopted. At approximately this time, a Roman circus, city walls, public baths, and a municipal water supply and storage system were constructed in Toletum.

The Roman circus in Toledo was one of the largest in Hispania. The circus could hold up to 15,000 spectators. A fragmentary stone inscription records circus games paid for by a citizen of unknown name to celebrate his achieving the sevirate, a kind of priesthood conferring high status. Games were held in the circus late into the 4th and early 5th centuries, an indication of active city life and ongoing patronage by wealthy elites. 

Toledo started to gain importance in late antiquity. There are indications that large private houses (domus) within the city walls were enlarged, while several large villas were built north of the city through the 3rd and 4th centuries. A church council was held in Toledo in the year 400 and 527 to discuss the conflict with Priscillianism. Already since 546 (possibly earlier), Visigoth rulers installed the capital of their kingdom in Toledo. King Theudis was in Toledo in 546, where he promulgated a law.

Throughout the 7th century, a series of church councils—the so-called Councils of Toledo—discussed on the theological reconciliations on Nicene Christianity; they were held in Toledo under the Visigoths. By the end of the 7th century the bishop of Toledo was the leader of all other bishops in Hispania, a situation unusual in Europe. It was also unmatched as a symbolic center of monarchy.

When internal divisions developed under the Visigothic nobles, Tariq bin Ziyad captured Toledo in 711 or 712, on behalf of the Umayyad Caliphate of Damascus, as part of the Islamic conquest of the Iberian Peninsula. Tariq's superior, Governor Musa disembarked in Cádiz and proceeded to Toledo, where he executed the Visigothic nobles, destroying much of the existing power structure.

Middle Ages

In the wake of the Umayyad conquest, "Toledo suffered a period of profound decline throughout much of the earlier centuries of Arab dominance in the peninsula." 

The invaders were ethnically diverse, and available evidence suggests that in the area of Toledo (locally known as Ṭulayṭulah under Islamic rule), Berber settlement predominated over Arab. In 742 the Berbers in Al-Andalus rebelled against the Arab Umayyad governors. They took control of the north and laid an unsuccessful siege on Toledo.

Toledo retained its importance as a literary and ecclesiastical centre well into the mid-8th century; as demonstrated by the Chronicle of 754. During this period, several letters show of the primacy that the church of Toledo held.

Under the Umayyad Emirate of Cordoba, Toledo was the centre of numerous insurrections against Cordobese government dating from 761 to 857. Girbib ibn-Abdallah, a poet from Toledo wrote verses against the Umayyads, helping to inspire a revolt in Toledo against the new emir in 797. By the end of the 8th century, the Umayyads had made Toledo the administrative center of the Central March of Al-Andalus. In 852, a new revolt broke out in Toledo. The Umayyad governor was held hostage in order to secure the return of Toledan hostages held in Córdoba. In reprisal of a prior attack by Toledans, emir Muhammad I sent an army to attack the Toledans, but was defeated. Toledo forged an alliance with King Ordoño I of Asturias. They fought together at the Battle of Guadacelete but lost. Later in 857, the Toledans attacked Talavera but were again defeated. In 859, Muhammad I negotiated a truce with Toledo. The city became virtually independent for twenty years, though locked in conflict with neighboring cities. Cordobese authorities re-asserted control over Toledo in 873, after the successful Umayyad siege on the city, which forced defenders to submit. The Banu Qasi gained nominal control of the city until 920. Following a new period of unruliness in the 920 and 930s, Caliph Abd-ar-Rahman III captured the city in 932, following an extensive siege.

In the wake of the early 11th-century Fitna of al-Andalus, Toledo became the centre of an independent polity, the so-called Taifa of Toledo, under the rule of the Dhu l-Nunids. The population of Toledo at this time was about 28,000, including a Jewish population of 4,000. The Mozarab community had its own Christian bishop. The taifa was centered on the Tajo River and bordered Sierra de Guadarrama, Guadalajara, Medinaceli, the Taifa of Valencia and the Mountains of Toledo.

The taifa fell in political disarray, owing to the economic draining caused by the parias (tributes) imposed by the kingdom of León as well as territorial mutilations, and so a revolt erupted in 1079, which was followed by the Aftasid ruler of Badajoz taking control of the city.

On 25 May 1085, Alfonso VI of León took Toledo and established direct personal control over the city from which he had been exacting tribute. Upon that time, the city's demographics featured a heterogeneous composition, with both Mozarabs, Muslims and Jewish communities, to which incoming Christians from northern Iberia and Frankish elements added up, so, initially, different fueros were simultaneously in force for each community. After the Christian conquest, the city's Mozarab community grew by immigration from the Muslim south.

Toledo preserved its status as a cultural centre; and a tag-team translation centre was established in which books in Arabic or Hebrew would be translated into Castilian by Muslim and Jewish scholars, and from Castilian into Latin by Castilian scholars, thus letting long-lost knowledge spread through Christian Europe again. Under the Roman Catholic Archdiocese of Toledo multiple persecutions (633, 653, 693) and stake burnings of Jews (638 CE) occurred; the Kingdom of Toledo followed up on this tradition (1368, 1391, 1449, 1486–1490 CE) including forced conversions and mass murder and the rioting and blood bath against the Jews of Toledo (1212 CE).

Modern era

During the persecution of the Jews in the late 15th and early 16th centuries, members of the Jewish community of Toledo produced texts on their long history in Toledo.

After the crushing of the Revolt of the Comuneros, Charles V's court was installed in Toledo, with the monarch choosing the city as his residence at least 15 times from 1525 on. Charles granted the city a coat of arms. From 1528 to 1561 the population increased from 31,930 to 56,270. In 1561, during the first years of his son Philip II's reign, the Royal Court was set in Madrid.

The archbishops of Toledo remained as powerful brokers in the political and religious affairs of Spain for the rest of the Ancien Régime, also owning an extensive seigneurial land across most of the southern half of the Inner Plateau and some nearing territories.The mass arrival of deported unruly moriscos from Granada ('moriscos nuevos') in Toledo and its lands (6,000 arrived to the city only, at least temporarily) in the wake of the Alpujarras rebellion posed a formidable logistic challenge, and the uneasy preexisting system of social relations between the moros viejos ('old moors') and the old christians was disrupted. By and large, Granadan new moriscos were subject to xenophobic abuse and became stigmatised as bloodthirsty and sacrilegious.

The city excelled in silk manufacturing during the Early Modern Period. The silk industry reached a peak in the 16th century, entering a protracted decline in the later years of that century and ultimately disappearing by the turn of the 19th century.

The Peninsular War affected the city in a very negative way. Over the course of the 19th century, Toledo underwent a progressive change from convent-city to bureaucratic city. Being a city quite impervious to external influence at the time, Bourgeoisie exerted a limited influence.

Following the exclusion of Toledo from the railway to the Portuguese border in the 1850s, a project of railway connection from Castillejo to Toledo lobbied by the Marquis of Salamanca was passed in June 1856. The line was opened on 12 June 1858. A budding tourism activity fostered by the arrival of rail contributed to the development of the hospitality industry in the late 19th century. By the turn of the 20th century, Toledo's population stood at about 23,000 inhabitants. The neighborhood of Santa Bárbara came into existence after the arrival of rail.

Following the July 1936 coup d'etat in Spain, the acting military commander in Toledo, José Moscardó, refused to provide weapons to Madrid and hid instead in the alcázar with a garrison of about 1,000 rebels, food, ammunition and some hostages. After 21 July, they became subject to an unsuccessful siege by forces loyal to the Republic during the early stages of the Spanish Civil War. Leading rebel general (and soon-to-be "caudillo") Francisco Franco and his Army of Africa took a detour from their advance towards Madrid (that gave time to the Republicans to build up the defenses in Madrid and receive early foreign support) and lifted the siege of the alcázar in late September 1936. The two months of resistance of the garrisoned rebel military would become a core symbolical feature of the mythology built around the Francoist regime and its ideology.

By 1950, the population stood at 40,243. Urban planning vis-à-vis the development of the neighborhoods of Palomarejos and Polígono ensued in the second half of the 20th century.

In the 1980s, in the context of the creation of the autonomous communities in Spain, Toledo became the de facto capital of the autonomous community of Castilla–La Mancha, hosting the seat of the Cortes of Castilla–La Mancha (the regional legislature) and the presidency of the regional government (the executive).

Climate
Toledo has a typical cold semi-arid climate (Köppen: BSk). Winters are cool while summers are hot and dry. Precipitation is low and mainly concentrated in the period mid autumn through to mid spring.

Economy

The metal-working industry has historically been Toledo's economic base, with a great tradition in the manufacturing of swords and knives and a significant production of razor blades, medical devices and electrical products. (The Toledo Blade, the American newspaper in Toledo's Ohio namesake city, is named in honor of the sword-making tradition.) Soap and toothpaste industries, flour milling, glass and ceramics have also been important. Goya Foods has its Madrid offices in Toledo.

The manufacture of swords in the city of Toledo goes back to Roman times, but it was under Moorish rule and during the Reconquista that Toledo and its guild of sword-makers played a key role. Between the 15th and 17th centuries the Toledo sword-making industry enjoyed a great boom, to the point where its products came to be regarded as the best in Europe. Swords and daggers were made by individual craftsmen, although the sword-makers guild oversaw their quality. In the late 17th and early 18th century production began to decline, prompting the creation of the Royal Arms Factory in 1761 by order of King Carlos III. The Royal Factory brought together all the sword-makers guilds of the city and it was located in the former mint. In 1777, recognizing the need to expand the space, Carlos III commissioned the architect Sabatini to construct a new building on the outskirts of the city. This was the beginning of several phases of expansion. Its importance was such that it eventually developed into a city within the city of Toledo.

In the 20th century, the production of knives and swords for the army was reduced to cavalry weapons only, and after the Spanish Civil War, to the supply of swords to the officers and NCOs of the various military units. Following the closure of the factory in the 1980s, the building was renovated to house the campus of the Technological University of Castilla-La Mancha in Toledo. According to the Statistical Institute of Castilla-La Mancha, in 2007 the recent distribution of employment by sectors of occupation was as follows: 86.5% of the population engaged in the services, 6.6% in construction, 5.4% in industry and 1.5% in agriculture and livestock.

Unemployment
In the decade to 2008, unemployment in absolute terms remained fairly stable in the city of Toledo, but in 2009 this figure increased significantly: nearly 62% compared to 2008, with the number of unemployed rising from 2,515 to 4,074 (figures at 31 March each year), according to the Junta de Comunidades de Castilla La Mancha. Of this 62%, one third of the increase took place in the first quarter.

According to other statistics from the same source, almost half the unemployed in the city of Toledo (1,970 persons) are among those whose education does not go beyond the compulsory secondary level. However, there are groups whose level of studies is such that they have not been registered as unemployed, such as those who have completed class 1 professional training, or those with virtually nonexistent unemployment rates (less than 0.1%), which is the case of unemployed with high school degrees or professional expertise.

The largest group among the unemployed is those who have no qualifications (27.27%).

Politics

Toledo has a 25-member City Council, elected by closed lists every four years. The 2011 election saw a pact made between the 11 members of the Spanish Socialist Workers' Party (PSOE) and the 2 members of the United Left, to retain the position of the PSOE's Emiliano García-Page Sánchez as mayor, which he has been since 2007.

Culture
The old city is located on a mountaintop with a 150-degree view, surrounded on three sides by a bend in the Tagus River, and contains many historical sites, including the Alcázar, the cathedral (the primate church of Spain), and the Zocodover, a central market place.

From the 4th century to the 16th century about thirty synods were held at Toledo. The earliest, directed against Priscillian, assembled in 400. At the synod of 589 the Visigothic King Reccared declared his conversion from Arianism to Catholicism; the synod of 633 decreed uniformity of catholic liturgy throughout the Visigothic kingdom and took stringent measures against baptized Jews who had relapsed into their former faith. Other councils forbade circumcision, Jewish rites and observance of the Sabbath and festivals. Throughout the seventh century, Jews were flogged, executed, had their property confiscated, were subjected to ruinous taxes, forbidden to trade and, at times, dragged to the baptismal font. The council of 681 assured to the archbishop of Toledo the primacy of Spain. At Guadamur, very close to Toledo, the Treasure of Guarrazar was excavated in 1858, the best example of Visigothic art in Spain.

As nearly one hundred early canons of Toledo found a place in the Decretum Gratiani, they exerted an important influence on the development of ecclesiastical law. The synod of 1565–1566 concerned itself with the execution of the decrees of the Council of Trent; and the last council held at Toledo, 1582–1583, was guided in detail by Philip II.

Toledo had large communities of Muslims and Jews until they were expelled from Spain in 1492 (Jews) and 1502 (Mudéjars). Today's city contains the religious monuments the Synagogue of Santa María la Blanca, the Synagogue of El Transito, Mosque of Cristo de la Luz and the church of San Sebastián dating from before the expulsion, still maintained in good condition. Among Ladino-speaking Sephardi Jews, in their various diasporas, the family name Toledano is still prevalent – indicating an ancestry traced back to this city (the name is also attested among non-Jews in various Spanish-speaking countries).

In the 13th century, Toledo was a major cultural centre under the guidance of Alfonso X, called "El Sabio" ("the Wise") for his love of learning. The Toledo School of Translators, that had commenced under Archbishop Raymond of Toledo, continued to bring vast stores of knowledge to Europe by rendering great academic and philosophical works in Arabic into Latin. The Palacio de Galiana, built in the Mudéjar style, is one of the monuments that remain from that period.

The Cathedral of Toledo (Catedral de Toledo) was built between 1226 and 1493 and modeled after the Bourges Cathedral, though it also combines some characteristics of the Mudéjar style. It is remarkable for its incorporation of light and features the Baroque altar called El Transparente, several stories high, with fantastic figures of stucco, paintings, bronze castings, and multiple colors of marble, a masterpiece of medieval mixed media by Narciso Tomé topped by the daily effect for just a few minutes of a shaft of light from which this feature of the cathedral derives its name. Two notable bridges secured access to Toledo across the Tajo, the Alcántara bridge and the later built San Martín bridge.

The Monasterio de San Juan de los Reyes is a Franciscan monastery, built 1477–1504, in a remarkable combination of Gothic-Spanish-Flemish style with Mudéjar ornamentation.

Toledo was home to El Greco for the latter part of his life, and is the subject of some of his most famous paintings, including The Burial of the Count of Orgaz, exhibited in the Church of Santo Tomé.

When Philip II moved the royal court from Toledo to Madrid in 1561, the old city went into a slow decline from which it never recovered.

Toledo steel

Toledo has been a traditional sword-making, steel-working centre since about 500 BCE, and came to the attention of Rome when used by Hannibal in the Punic Wars. Soon, it became a standard source of weaponry for Roman legions.

Toledo steel was famed for its very high quality alloy, whereas Damascene steel, a competitor from the Middle Ages on, was also famed for a specific metal-working technique.

Today there is a significant trade, and many shops offer all kinds of swords to their customers, whether historical or modern films swords, as well as medieval armors and from other times, which are also exported to other countries.

Gastronomy

Some of the local specialties include lamb roast or stew, cochifrito, alubias con perdiz (beans with partridge) and perdiz estofoda (partridge stew), carcamusa, migas, gachas manchegas, and tortilla a la magra. In addition, in Toledo there are local versions of dishes from the nearby capital of Spain, Madrid, as is the case of the cocido toledano. Two of the city's most famous food productions are Manchego cheese and marzipan, which has a Protected Geographical Indication (mazapán de Toledo).

Holidays

The Virgen del Valle pilgrimage is celebrated on May 1 at the Ermita de la Virgen del Valle, with a concentration popular holiday in that place. The Holy Week, declared of National Tourist Interest, is held in spring with various processions, highlighting those that take place on Good Friday, and religious and cultural events. The  enjoys the status of celebration of International Tourist Interest since 1980. It was conventionally celebrated 60 days after the Sunday of Resurrection. The celebration of the feasts on the part of the Catholic Church had its heyday during the Baroque, post-Trent period. The Virgen del Sagrario is celebrated on 15 August, in honour of the Virgen del Sagrario, featuring a procession inside the Cathedral and drinking water of the Virgin in jars.

Main sights

The city of Toledo was declared a Historic-Artistic Site in 1940, UNESCO later given the title of World Heritage in 1987. Sights include:
 Tomb of Saint Beatrice of Silva, founder of the Order of the Immaculate Conception, at the Monastery of the Conceptionist nuns of Toledo.
 Posada de la Santa Hermandad, a type of military peacekeeping association of armed individuals, characteristic of municipal life in medieval Spain.
 Castle of San Servando, medieval castle near the banks of the Tagus river and the Infantry Academy.
 The Gothic Cathedral of Saint Mary of Toledo, dating from the thirteenth century. Inside there is the Clear from Narciso Tome, in Baroque.
 Monasterio de San Juan de los Reyes, in Isabelline Gothic style (15th century).
 The Renaissance Museo-Hospital de Santa Cruz (16th century).
 El Greco Museum, a house-museum designed as a recreation of the artist's home, which was lost centuries ago. It houses several important paintings.
 Santa María la Blanca, the oldest synagogue building in Europe still standing, now owned by the Catholic Church.
 Synagogue of El Transito, in the Jewish Quarter. It is home to the Sephardic Museum.
 Hospital de Tavera Museum Duque de Lerma. Renaissance style, dates from the sixteenth century. Influenced the layout of El Escorial.
 Church of Santiago del Arrabal, in Mudéjar style.
 Iglesia de Santo Tome. Mudéjar style, the fourteenth century, houses the famous Burial of Count Orgaz, by El Greco.
 El Cristo de la Luz, a former small mosque-oratory built in 999, later extended with Mudéjar apse for conversion into a Catholic church.
 Galiana Palace (13th century), in Mudéjar style.
 Tornerías Mosque (11th century).
 Alcázar fortress (16th century), located in the highest part of town, overlooking the city. From 2009 it houses the collection of the Army Museum.
 Iglesia de San Andrés, In its crypt are 60 mummies of infantes, dukes, nuns and others, in a good state of preservation, open to visitors.
 Puerta Bab al-Mardum (10th century), the oldest city gate of Toledo.
 Puerta de Bisagra Antigua (10th century), the main entrance to the city in Andalusian times. Also known as "Puerta de Alfonso VI".
 Puerta del Sol (14th century), built by the Knights Hospitallers.
 Puerta de Bisagra Nueva (16th century), of Moorish origin re-built by Alonso de Covarrubias. The main entrance and face of Toledo today.
 Puerta del Cambrón, of Muslim origin, re-built in the 16th century.
 San Román (Museum of the Councils and Visigoth culture).
 Ermita del Cristo de la Vega, in Mudéjar style (11th century).
 Alcántara bridge, Roman bridge across the Tagus.
 Puente de San Martin, medieval bridge across the Tagus.
To mark the fourth centenary of the publication of the first part of Don Quixote, the Council of Communities of Castile–La Mancha designed a series of routes through the region crossing the various points cited in the novel. Known as the Route of Don Quixote, two of the pathways designated, sections 1 and 8, are based in Toledo; those linking the city with La Mancha Castile and Montes de Toledo exploit the natural route which passes through the Cigarrales and heads to Cobisa, Nambroca Burguillos of Toledo, where it takes the Camino Real from Sevilla to suddenly turn towards Mascaraque Almonacid de Toledo, deep into their surroundings, near Mora, in La Mancha.

This stretch, Mascaraque-Toledo, of the Route of Don Quixote has recently been included in an official way on the Camino de Santiago in Levantine branch with origins in Cartagena, Alicante and Valencia, as both routes are declared a European Cultural Route on this stretch.

Transport
Toledo has long been an obligatory stop in the centre of the peninsula. The roads leading to historic Toledo are still used and in many cases have provided the basis to existing roads leading into the city.

Roads
From Toledo part of N-400, which links this city with Cuenca by Ocaña and Tarancón. It is currently in the process of transformation in the future A-40 motorway Castilla La Mancha, which will link Maqueda (where it joins the motorway Extremadura), Toledo, Ocaña (where it attaches to the Motorway of Andalusia), Tarancón (where connects with the motorway Levante), Cuenca and Teruel.

The old National Road 401 Madrid-Toledo-Ciudad Real was transformed in the late 1980s into the current A-42 as a result of splitting and deleting the path that the various crossings counted (Illescas, Yuncos, etc.).

At this point, the A-42 connects with the Highway of the Vineyard that reaches Tomelloso. It is planned to extend the A-42, by a toll road, to Ciudad Real and Jaén.

In the early twenty-first century the toll motorway AP-41 was built, in order to reduce traffic congestion between Toledo and Madrid.

Another way of State Highway Network that Toledo is part of the N-403, Toledo-Maqueda – Ávila – Adanero. Part of the route of this road will be replaced by that of the aforementioned Highway of Castilla La Mancha.

In addition to these roads, several regional and provincial-level roads depart from Toledo linking the city with the regions of Montes de Toledo, La Jara and La Mancha.

Rail

In the mid-nineteenth century Toledo was one of the first Spanish cities to receive rail service, with the arrival of the Madrid – Aranjuez line, which was inaugurated by Isabella II on June 12 of 1858. The current station, Toledo Railway Station (built in Neo-Mudéjar style), was opened on April 24 of 1919.

The line suffered some technical issues and service disruptions, but continued to serve as the main intercity route until the early twenty-first century. On 2 July, 2003 the last conventional train service between the two capitals ended and work began on a high-speed link to Madrid, which entered service on November 16 of 2005. The new line reduced the travel time to Madrid to just under 30 minutes.

Health
In the early 1960s began the construction of the Residence Health Social Security "Virgen de la Salud". The original building still remains in use, although successive extensions were added (maternity, outpatient clinics, operating rooms, etc.) into the existing complex. The complex was also extended to move the clinic to a new nearby building, now converted into Specialty Centre San Ildefonso.

The , inaugurated on 7 October 1974, became a centre of reference at the national level in the treatment of spinal cord injuries. It also focuses on the social integration of their patients.

The transfer of powers from the state health at the Junta de Comunidades de Castilla La Mancha will give new impetus to the health infrastructure, manifested in 2007 with the commencement of construction of the new General Hospital of Toledo in Santa María de Benquerencia. Also have been provided to the different parts of the relevant health centres.

In the Toledo Hospital Complex [36] is also integrated Geriatric Hospital Virgen del Valle, a result of reform and modernization of old tuberculosis hospital built in the mid twentieth century. The centre is located outside the city, near the Parador Nacional de Turismo Conde de Orgaz.

With regard to private health, at present the city of Toledo has several centres: Hospital de las Tres Culturas, Clínica Nuestra Señora del Rosario, and so on.

Sport
Toledo suffered from a shortage of sports facilities. Much of this problem was resolved when the Central School of Physical Education of the Army moved its headquarters to the premises of the Academy of Infantry. In the 1990s, the city council took over the old facilities of the military centre, which now include an athletics track, Olympic swimming pool and an indoor sports hall, from the former military installations, and numerous outdoor courts built in the area of the former runway of application, having been demolished and the old gym complex pools (indoor and outdoor).

Besides these facilities, the city of Toledo has covered sports pavilions in the districts of Santa María de Benquerencia, Santa Bárbara, San Antón (Complejo Deportivo "Leaping Horse"), outdoor pools in sugar, Palomarejos, Santa María de Benquerencia, Santa Barbara, Santa Teresa and indoor swimming pools in the gardens of the Alcazar (old town), Santa María de Benquerencia and San Antonio.

Toledo has a football team, CD Toledo, founded on 24 April 1928. Their home turf is the Estadio Salto del Caballo, inaugurated on 23 November 1973. The team played for 7 seasons in the Segunda División, during which it reached the play-off final for promotion to La Liga at the end of the 1993–94 season, losing 4–1 on aggregate to Real Valladolid. Toledo players have included Abel Resino, Luis Garcia, former Arsenal coach Unai Emery, Rufete and Casquero. In the 2020-21 season, CD Toledo will play in the Tercera División, the fourth tier of Spanish football.

Toledo also has teams of handball. The Toledo Handball, after five years in the Division de Honor B, start the 2009–2010 season as ASOBAL new club for the first time in its history. A refurbished town hall "Javier Lozano Cid", with capacity for around 1,500 spectators, is its new headquarters. Moreover, the city has two other Division II team in the National, the Toledo Handball Lábaro-B and Club Deportivo Amibal.

Toledo has two basketball teams: the CIS Toledo, with a long history that has gone through ups and downs in both regional and in national leagues (EBA) and has just promoted to 1st Autonomic, and CB Polígono, currently the most representative, whose team has promoted male, seven years after leaving, to EBA League to start the 2009/10 season. This club based in the Santa María de Benquerencia district and has one of the largest youth systems of Castilla-La Mancha.

Toledo has been represented in athletics since 2 April 1979 by the Toledo Athletic Club, that is characterised by its actions, mainly in cross-country, where he managed a large number of medals in the championships team Spain's specialty, in addition to their combined male and female military in the late 1990s in the 1st division league national track. Among the athletes who have passed through its lanes are great athletes as Julio Rey, Roberto Parra, Chema Martinez and Julia Lobato.

Cycling, meanwhile, after the victory in the Tour de France in 1959 by Federico Bahamontes, 'The Eagle of Toledo', has been one of the sports with more followers in the city, although, at present, no school despite having a velodrome in Santa María de Benquerencia. Other leading professional cyclists from the city have been Nemesio Jiménez (Mexico Olympics 1968) and Ángel de las Heras.

The FS and Volleyball Toledo Toledo Association Toledo complete representation in the National League of First and Second Division, after a brief journey in Fantasy, respectively, while the Toledo Rugby Club, with many fans, is immersed in the League Madrid's Primera Liga.

At the individual level, the swimmer Javier Noriega and Julio Rey marathon athletes are more representative of the city, both in Athens Olympics 2004 and Beijing Olympics 2008, in recent years. Rey, Spanish current marathon record holder, with 2h.06:52, announced his retirement in October 2009.

Media
Various local and provincial newspapers are published in the city. In addition, national newspapers such as the daily ABC publish unique local editions. Among the local newspapers are the subscription-based La Tribuna de Toledo, and Toledo Day, as well as the free Global Castilla la Mancha and Toledo News. The general information weekly magazines Echoes and Here are also published.

There is also local media in television, radio, and Internet. The regional public television headquarters, CMT, are in Toledo. In addition, there are several local television stations, as well as local fare: the diocesan Popular TV, Teletoledo, Canal Regional de Noticia and La Tribuna TV.

For radio stations, there is the dean of radio Radio Toledo (Onda Cero), as well as COPE, Cadena SER, RNE, RCM and Radio Aquí, and the local fare Onda Polígono and the diocesan station Radio Santa Maria. Within the digital and social media, Onda Toledo, Toledo Magic, Toledo Digital, and La Cerca.

Twin towns – sister cities

Toledo is twinned with:

Aachen, Germany (1984)
Agen, France (1973)
Corpus Christi, Texas, United States (1989)
Damascus, Syria (1994)
Guanajuato City, Mexico (1978)
Heraklion, Greece (2014)
Nara, Japan (1972)
Old Havana, Cuba (2005)
Safed, Israel (1981)
Toledo, Ohio, United States (1931)
Veliko Tarnovo, Bulgaria (1983)

See also

 Golden age of Jewish culture in Spain
 Councils of Toledo
 Toledo School of Translators
 Palacio de Galiana
 Cerro del Bu
 Artificio de Juanelo
 List of people from Toledo, Spain

References
Informational notes

Citations

Also

External links

 Municipality
 Spain's official website – Info about Toledo

 
Castilla–La Mancha
 
 
Historic Jewish communities
Archaeological sites in Spain
Roman sites in Spain
Roman towns and cities in Spain
World Heritage Sites in Spain